The list shows airports that are served by XiamenAir as part of its scheduled services (as of July 2016). The list includes the city, country, the codes of the International Air Transport Association (IATA airport code) and the International Civil Aviation Organization (ICAO airport code), and the airport's name, with the airline's hubs and focus cities marked.

List

References

Lists of airline destinations
XiamenAir
SkyTeam destinations

id:Bandara-bandara Tujuan Xiamen Airlines